Subas Chandra Nemwang (Limbu) (born 11 March 1953) is a Nepalese politician and the former chairman of Constituent Assembly of Nepal. He was the first elected Free Students Union chairman of Mahendra Ratna Campus in Ilam and also elected as general secretary of Nepal Bar Association in 1987. In February 2023, he was chosen as a candidate in the 2023 Nepalese presidential election from CPN-UML, but lost to Ram Chandra Paudel of Nepali Congress.

Early career and background 
Born in Suntalabari in Ilam District, Nemwang emerged victorious from Ilam-2 in all elections held after the restoration of democracy in 1990. He won both legislative elections of 1991 and 1999, and went on to hold key posts like the chairman of Public Accounts Committee and chairman of the Constituent Assembly.

He has two daughters and two sons.

CA elections

In the CA election 2008, Nembang was elected from Ilam-3. He again contested and won from Ilam-2 in the CA election 2013. He led the Constituent Assembly 2 as the Speaker which passed and promulgated the Constitution of Nepal 2015.

See also
Sushil Koirala
Surya Bahadur Thapa
Lokendra Bahadur Chand
Girija Prasad Koirala
Prachanda
Baburam Bhattarai
Jhala Nath Khanal

References 

1953 births
Living people
Nepalese atheists
Limbu people
People from Ilam District
Communist Party of Nepal (Unified Marxist–Leninist) politicians
Government ministers of Nepal
Nepal MPs 2017–2022
Nepal Communist Party (NCP) politicians
Chairpersons of the Constituent Assembly of Nepal
Nepal MPs 1999–2002
Members of the National Assembly (Nepal)
Nepal Law Campus alumni

Members of the 1st Nepalese Constituent Assembly
Members of the 2nd Nepalese Constituent Assembly
Nepal MPs 2022–present
Candidates for President of Nepal